The 2015 Georgia State Panthers football team represented Georgia State University (GSU) in the 2015 NCAA Division I FBS football season. The Panthers were led by third-year head coach Trent Miles and played their home games at the Georgia Dome. The 2015 season was the Panthers' third in the Sun Belt Conference. They finished the season 6–7, 5–3 in Sun Belt play to finish in fourth place. They became bowl-eligible for the first time in program history and were invited to the inaugural Cure Bowl where they lost to San Jose State.

Schedule

Schedule source:

Game summaries

Charlotte

at New Mexico State

at Oregon

Liberty

Appalachian State

at Ball State

at Arkansas State

Louisiana–Lafayette

at Texas State

South Alabama

Troy

at Georgia Southern

vs San Jose State (Cure Bowl)

References

Georgia State
Georgia State Panthers football seasons
Georgia State Panthers football